Mujeeb-ur-Rehman Omar is an Afghan Taliban politician who is currently serving as Deputy Minister of Energy and Water since 21-September 2021.

References

Living people
Year of birth missing (living people)
Taliban government ministers of Afghanistan